Brigadier Ernest Bulmer,  (27 July 1900 – 2 June 1967), was a physician and British Army officer who served in the Second World War in the Battle of France, the Western Desert campaign and the campaigns in north-west Europe as a consulting physician with the 21st Army Group.

Early life
Ernest Bulmer was born in Newcastle-upon-Tyne on 27 July 1900, the son of Septimus Bulmer, a manufacturer of rope machines, and his wife Lilian  Glover, a niece of Terrot R. Glover. He was educated at Dr. Ehrlich's School, and then entered Edinburgh University, from which he earned the degree of MBBS with second class honours in 1922. While there he served with the Edinburgh University contingent of the Officers' Training Corps.

Bulmer continued his medical studies with a year at a hospital in Paris, then did his residency at Birmingham General Hospital, where he became an assistant physician in 1925. He became a member of the Royal College of Physicians of Edinburgh in 1924 and a Doctor of Medicine the following year. In 1926 he became a member of the Royal College of Physicians, and was elected a fellow in 1936. In 1927 Bulmer married Dr. Eileen Wake, a fellow resident at the Birmingham General Hospital. They had one child, a son called Michael who became a biometrician.

Second World War
On 8 May 1939, Bulmer joined the 14th Birmingham Territorial Hospital as a medical specialist, with the rank of major.

After further service in the UK, Bulmer became a consulting physician to the 21st Army Group, with the rank of brigadier, in 1944. In March 1945,  he rendered a professional opinion that Field Marshal Sir Bernard Montgomery's chief of staff, Major-General Sir Francis de Guingand, was exhausted and needed to be placed on sick leave. After Montgomery and de Guingand protested, he agreed to treat de Guingand with sedatives. This deal was made subject to the war in Europe ending within three months, which it did. For his services with the 21st Army Group, Bulmer was mentioned in despatches, raised to a Commander of the Order of the British Empire, and decorated with the American Legion of Merit in the degree of commander in person by General of the Army Dwight D. Eisenhower.

Post-war
Bulmer left the Army in 1947 to become a physician on the staff of the United Birmingham Hospitals as a physician, and he remained as a senior consultant at  Queen Elizabeth Hospital Birmingham until he retired in 1965. He remained a reservist, earning the Territorial Decoration in 1950. He retired from military service on 9 October 1954, retaining the honorary rank  of colonel.
In 1958, Bulmer was elected a fellow of the Royal College of Physicians of Edinburgh. He published papers on many subjects, but particularly on gastrointestinal diseases, and the treatment of dyspepsia. During the war he investigated treatment for dysentery and tropical diseases, and military ailments like combat fatigue. 

Bulmer served on the board of governors of the United Birmingham Hospitals, and as chairman of its medical advisory committee. He was  president of the Midland Medical Society from 1959 to 1960, and chairman of the Birmingham Division of the British Medical Association from 1958 to 1960, and a member of it council from 1960 to 1962. He was on the Board of Clinical Studies at Birmingham University, and was its chairman for many years. He was president and a founding member in 1961 of the Society of British Gastroenterologists, and of the Association of Physicians of Great Britain in 1962. As a member of the Civil defence Committee of the Birmingham Regional Hospital Board, he helped prepare the medical arrangements for a major disaster. His last official appointment was as a deputy lieutenant for Warwickshire on 13 May 1967.  

In later life Bulmer suffered from asthma. He died in Queen Elizabeth Hospital Birmingham on 2 June 1967.

References

1900 births
1967 deaths
20th-century English medical doctors
Alumni of the University of Edinburgh
British Army brigadiers of World War II
Commanders of the Order of the British Empire
Officers of the Legion of Merit
Fellows of the Royal College of Physicians
Fellows of the Royal College of Physicians of Edinburgh
Foreign recipients of the Legion of Merit
Military personnel from Newcastle upon Tyne
Academics of the University of Birmingham